Sitting Army is the first full-length studio release by Cobra Skulls.  It was released by Red Scare Industries on July 10, 2007.

Track listing 
All songs written by Cobra Skulls.
"Cobra Skullifornia" - 3:05
"Faith Is A Cobra" - 3:02
"The Cobra and the Man-Whore" - 2:12
"Don't Count Your Cobras Before They Hatch" - 1:41
"Charming the Cobra" - 3:16
"Use Your Cobra Skulls" - 1:45
"I'll Always Be A Cobra Skull (Folk Off!)" - 1:48
"Anybody Scene My Cobra?" - 1:44
"Cobra Skulls Lockdown" - 2:27
"¡Hasta Los Cobra Skulls Siempre!" - 1:42
"Cobra Skulls Graveyard" - 1:44
"Cobra Skulls Jukebox" - 2:18
"Cobracoustic" - 2:48

Personnel
Chad Cleveland - Drums
Devin Peralta - Bass, Vocals, Music, Lyrics, album art
Charlie Parker - Guitar
Joe Johnston - Engineer
Eric Broyhill - Mastering
Dusty Hartman - Photos
Bill Nutt - Art Direction, Layout

Cobra Skulls albums
2007 albums
Red Scare Industries albums